Wielandomyces is a fungal genus in the family Bolbitiaceae. This is a monotypic genus, containing the single species Wielandomyces robustus, found in Europe. The genus and species were described by Jörg Raithelhuber in 1988.

See also
 List of Agaricales genera

References

Bolbitiaceae
Fungi of Europe
Monotypic Agaricales genera